Mohamed Sylla (born 1 December 1993) is a French professional footballer who plays as a midfielder for League Two side Hartlepool United.

Career
Born in Ivry, Sylla began his career with L'Entente SSG, where he made over 100 appearances before signing with English club Oldham Athletic in January 2019. He made his debut on 12 January 2019, in a League match against Forest Green Rovers. He returned to France in June 2020 to sign for Laval.

On 30 October 2021, Sylla joined National League side Aldershot Town, and went onto score on his debut later that day, during a 2–1 away defeat to Barnet. In the 2021–22 season, Sylla made 32 appearances in all competitions for Aldershot, scoring twice. Additionally, he also won the club's player of the year award.

On 4 August 2022, Sylla signed a one-year deal at League Two club Hartlepool United. On 1 January 2023, he scored his first goal for Hartlepool in a 3–3 draw with Harrogate Town.

Career statistics

Honours
Individual
Aldershot Town Supporters' Player of the Year: 2021–22

References

External links

1993 births
Living people
French footballers
Entente SSG players
Oldham Athletic A.F.C. players
Stade Lavallois players
Aldershot Town F.C. players
Hartlepool United F.C. players
Championnat National players
Championnat National 2 players
English Football League players
National League (English football) players
Association football midfielders
French expatriate footballers
French expatriate sportspeople in England
Expatriate footballers in England